Carroll M. Bierman (October 22, 1918 – March 22, 1970) was an American Thoroughbred horse racing jockey born in Centralia, Illinois. In 1940, he won the Kentucky Derby on Gallahadion in an upset over heavily favored Bimelech. That Derby ride is considered one of the best by a jockey in America's great race. Gallahadion paid $72.40 on a $2 bet for winning the "Run for the Roses" in the colors of Ethel V. Mars, of the Mars Candy fortune. He rode in the Kentucky Derby four times and finished 3rd, 4th, and 6th in the other three. He also won the 1939 Santa Anita Derby aboard the filly Ciencia.

On September 19 of 1942, in one of the great races of the American Turf, Bierman rode Preakness Stakes winner Alsab to victory over 1941 U.S. Triple Crown Champion Whirlaway in a famous match race at Narragansett Park.

Bierman's burgeoning career was interrupted by service with the United States Navy during World War II. Discharged in May 1945, he returned to racing after a fitness regimen designed to shed the weight he had gained.

He was a founding member of the Jockeys' Guild.

He rests at Elmwood Cemetery in Centralia, Illinois.

References

1918 births
1970 deaths
American jockeys
United States Navy personnel of World War II
People from Centralia, Illinois